Thelma Buabeng (born 31 March 1981 in  Ghana) is a German actress.

Life 
Thelma Buabeng grew up with two siblings in Meckenheim (Rhineland), where her family moved to from Ghana in 1984. She passed her high school diploma at the St. Joseph Gymnasium in Rheinbach; She then studied media marketing at the West German Academy of Communications in Cologne. Buabeng began her acting career in 1996 with the theater group "Junge Bühne Brotfabrik" in Bonn. After attending drama school in Cologne's "Theater der Keller" for two years, she moved to Berlin in 2005, where in 2009 she completed her acting training at the Filmschauspielschule Berlin. In 2003, she celebrated her television debut in the ARD series Lindenstraße. Thereafter, Thelma Buabeng was seen in inter alia, Der Kriminalist (TV),  (cinema) and several other scenes.

Buabeng is seen on various theatrical stages, such as Die Schutzbefohlenen at the Thalia Theater in Hamburg, 2014; Meteorites at the Maxim Gorki Theater in Berlin, 2016; Faust, Volksbühne on Rosa-Luxemburg-Platz, 2017 and Frank Castorf's Les Misérables at the Berliner Ensemble.

Filmography (selection) 
 2003: Lindenstraße (4 Episodes, Director: Kerstin Krause)
 2006: Berlin Bohème (8 Episodes)
 2010: Wenn Bäume Puppen tragen (short film Director: Ismail Sahin)
 2011: Der Kriminalist – Unter Druck (Director: Hannu Salonen)
 2012: Tatort – Ihr Kinderlein kommet (Director: Thomas Jauch)
 2012:  (Director: Hermine Huntgeburth)
 2013:  (Director: Uli Edel)
 2014: Ein Sommer in Amsterdam (Director: Karola Meeder)
 2015: Dora oder die sexuellen Neurosen unserer Eltern (Director: Stina Werenfels)
 2014: bestefreunde (Director: Jonas Grosch)
 2014: ... und dann kam Wanda (Director: Holger Haase)
 2015: Tatort – Verbrannt (Director: Thomas Stuber)
 2015:  (Director: Oskar Roehler)
 2015:  (Director: Dietrich Brüggemann)
 2015: Kommissarin Heller – Schattenriss (Regie: Christiane Balthasar)
 2016: Dating Alarm (Director: Holger Haase)
 2016: Tatort – Narben (Director: Torsten C. Fischer)
 2016:  –  (Director: Lars Becker)
 2017: Jerks. – Hindenburg (Director: Christian Ulmen)
 2017: Am Ruder (Director: Stephan Wagner)
 2017: Unter deutschen Betten (Director: Jan Fehse)
 2017: Hit Mom – Mörderische Weihnachten (Director: Sebastian Marka)
 2018: Echte Bauern singen besser

References

External links 

 Thelma Buabeng at filmportal.de
 Thelma Buabeng homepage

1981 births
Living people
German film actresses
21st-century German actresses
German stage actresses